Fok or FOK may refer to:

People
 Fok (surname), a list of people with the name

FOK
 FOK!, a Dutch website
 Prague Symphony Orchestra, a Czech orchestra known by the acronym FOK (Film-Opera-Koncert)
 Feeling of knowing
 Fill or kill, an order to buy or sell a stock immediately
 FOK, IATA airport code and FAA location ID for Francis S. Gabreski Airport, Long Island, New York, United States

See also 
 Huo, a Chinese surname pronounced Fok in Cantonese